Vladimir Sergeevich Dashkevich (born 20 January 1934) is a Russian composer, known mainly for his film music. Originally, he studied chemical technology at Moscow State University of Fine Chemical Technologies, but he later studied music under Aram Khachaturian. He achieved prominence in Russia for his music for the series of films The Adventures of Sherlock Holmes and Dr. Watson, as well as numerous other films. His longtime collaboration with famous singer Elena Kamburova has resulted in a number of vocal cycles based on the lyrics by the Russian Silver Age poets, including Requiem of Anna Akhmatova.

Main works 
 Symphony No. 1 (1964)
 Faustus, oratorio (1964)
 Concerto for cello and orchestra (1973)
 Bumbarash, musical (1974)
 The Bedbug, opera (1980)
 Pippi Longstocking, musical (1980)
 Along Unknown Paths (1982)
 How to Become Happy (1986)
 Symphony No. 4 Requiem (1988)
 Symphony No. 5 Save My Speech (1989)
 Katala (1989) 
 Voroshilov Sharpshooter (1999)
 Sonata in Three Movements (Соната в трех частях) for viola and piano (2004)
 The Government Inspector, opera (2007)
 Concerto No. 1 for viola and orchestra (2007)
 Concerto No. 2 for viola and orchestra (2007)
 The Twelve, opera (2014)

External links

 Vladimir Dashkevich. Short bio (Russ.)
 Biography of  Vladimir Dashkevich (Russ.)

Russian composers
Russian male composers
Soviet film score composers
Male film score composers
1934 births
Living people
Gnessin State Musical College alumni
Recipients of the USSR State Prize
Recipients of the Nika Award
20th-century Russian male musicians